The Ireland cricket team toured Bangladesh in March 2008 and played three One Day Internationals (ODIs).

Squads

Matches

ODI series

1st ODI

2nd ODI

3rd ODI

External links
Cricinfo, Bangladesh v Ireland 2007–08

2008 in Bangladeshi cricket
Bangladesh
International cricket competitions in 2007–08
Bangladeshi cricket seasons from 2000–01
Bang